Mark Center is an unincorporated community in central Mark Township, Defiance County, Ohio, United States. It has a post office with the ZIP code 43536.  It is located on Farmer-Mark Road, a short distance south of State Route 18.

History
Mark Center was laid out in 1875 when the railroad was extended to that point. The community was so named on account of its location being near the geographical center of Mark Township.

A post office has been in operation at Mark Center since 1875.

References

Unincorporated communities in Ohio
Unincorporated communities in Defiance County, Ohio
Populated places established in 1875
1875 establishments in Ohio